The discography of Matt Terry, an English singer and songwriter. Terry's debut studio album, Trouble, was released in November 2017. The album peaked at number twenty-nine on the UK Albums Chart. The album includes the singles "Sucker for You" and "Try".

Albums

Singles

As lead artist

As featured artist

Promotional singles

Songwriting credits

References

Discographies of British artists